Federico Serraiocco (born 27 September 1993) is an Italian professional footballer who plays as a goalkeeper.

Biography
Serraiocco was born in Pescara, in the Abruzzo region. He began his football career with his hometown club, Pescara, playing for the under-13 team in the 2005–06 season through to the under-17s in 2009–10. In the 2010–11 season he was signed by Chievo. He was a member of their reserve team, but never played first-team football, and was released at the end of the season.

Serraiocco returned to Abruzzo to sign for Teramo. He was the first choice goalkeeper in the 2011–12 Serie D season with 26 appearances, and helped the club win promotion back to the professional league. Teramo finished third in Group B in the 2013–14 Lega Pro Seconda Divisione season, thus qualifying for the 2014–15 Serie C season. They also sold Serraiocco to Serie B club Brescia on 31 January 2014 in a co-ownership arrangement whereby the player would spend the rest of the season with Teramo. In June 2014 the co-ownership deal was renewed.

In January 2015, Serraiocco signed on loan for Vicenza of Serie B.

On 12 February 2020, he signed with Serie C club Vis Pesaro until the end of the 2019–20 season.

References

External links
 AIC profile (data by football.it) 
 

1993 births
Sportspeople from Pescara
Footballers from Abruzzo
Living people
Italian footballers
Association football goalkeepers
Delfino Pescara 1936 players
A.C. ChievoVerona players
S.S. Teramo Calcio players
Brescia Calcio players
L.R. Vicenza players
A.C. Carpi players
Vis Pesaro dal 1898 players
Serie B players
Serie C players
Serie D players